Adjen Kotoku is a town in the Ga West Municipal District of the Greater Accra Region of Ghana. It is known as one of the best and fastest growing town as compared to other towns in Volta, Ashanti and Central regions of Ghana.It is also known as the most industrialized part of Greater Accra as there are most productive companies in West Africa sited there.

References

Twellium Industrial company

Populated places in the Greater Accra Region